CFLG-FM is a Canadian radio station, which broadcasts at 104.5 FM in Cornwall, Ontario. The station airs an adult-leaning contemporary hit radio format branded as 104.5 Fresh Radio.

History
The station was launched in 1957 by the city's daily newspaper, the Cornwall Standard Freeholder, with the call sign CKSF-FM. The newspaper also already owned AM sister station CKSF. Two years later, the stations were acquired by Stanley Shankman, the owner of CJSS-TV, and both changed their callsigns to CJSS as well.

Two years later, Shenkman sold his broadcast holdings. The TV station was sold to Ottawa's CJOH-TV, and the radio stations were sold to the local Émard family.

The radio stations were subsequently acquired by Tri Co Broadcasting in 1978, and CKSF-FM adopted its current callsign. CFLG originally aired a beautiful music format which has since been updated to the current AC sound. They are now owned by Corus Entertainment, who acquired CFLG, along with CJSS, in 2001.

The station had been branded as Variety 104.

On August 25, 2014, at 11 a.m., CFLG changed its branding to 104.5 Fresh FM. The first song on "Fresh" was "Hideaway" by Kiesza.

On February 13, 2015, CFLG was rebranded as 104.5 Fresh Radio to reflect all other Corus Radio owned "Fresh FM" stations.

On April 1, 2016, Shaw Media was sold to Corus Entertainment. It became a sister station to CFPL-FM, CFHK-FM and other radio stations.

In late 2021, competing station WYUL, which primarily targets the Cornwall and Greater Montreal areas from across the American border, was sold to Educational Media Foundation and switched from its longtime contemporary hit radio format. As a result, in 2022, CFLG moved into more of an adult top 40 direction, and was moved to Mediabase’s Canada top 40 panel.

Former logo

References

External links
 104.5 Fresh Radio
 
 

Flg
Flg
Flg
Radio stations established in 1957
1957 establishments in Ontario